Zaberezh (until 2016 called Zhovtneve) is a village in the Khust Raion of Zakarpattia Oblast, Ukraine. , its population was 722.

History 

In 1904, the village's name was changed to Dombtelep.

References

Villages in Khust Raion